Agaricus santacatalinensis is a species of agaric fungus. Described as new to science in 1998 by Edgardo Albertó, it is found in deciduous forests of Brazil, where it grows under privets (Ligustrum) and elm (Ulmus). Somewhat unusually, the gills mature centrifugally (from the cap center outward to the edge). Initially, they are ochre yellow before turning dark brown after the spores mature. It is white from the cap down to the ring, below which it becomes yellowish with orange tints. The base of the stipe has short yellowish rhizomorphs. The ring is membranous, measuring 1–2 mm thick. The edibility of the mushroom is unknown.

The spores are ellipsoid, and measure 5–5.5 by 3.5–5 µm. Agaricus santacatalinensis was initially classified in the subgenus Lanagaricus of the genus Agaricus.

See also
List of Agaricus species

References

External links
 

santacatalinensis
Fungi described in 1998
Fungi of Brazil